All Saints United F.C. is an Antigua and Barbuda football club in the Antigua and Barbuda Premier Division. The All Saints United Football Club was founded in 1996 where two community teams, the Westdnd Pressers and Attackers, came together to form the club. The team's motto is "When conviction runs, deep courage rises to sustain it."

Following the merger between the two local teams, the team played in the First Division League for several years. In 2005-2006 the team reigned supreme in the First Division League where it was promoted to the Antigua and Barbuda Premier Division. The team entered the league under the leadership of Alphanse Danials (former President) and retired coach Eliston Thomas. The team's highest position in the league was second place in the 2010/11 season.

In the 2013/2014 season, changes were made to the club: Danny Benjamin was fired as coach, head coach Rowan Benjamin resigned and took over the role of manager and former Attackers midfielder Tracey Allen became the head coach. Later they were relegated to the first division. After two failed promotion attempts, All Saints United signed Schyan Jeffers at the start of the 2016/17 season.

Current squad

External links
 All Saints United Football Club Results Football.co.uk
All Saints United Football Club Results soccerway.com

Football clubs in Antigua and Barbuda